Sheridon Sohan Emmanuel Gumbs (born 25 May 2004) is an English cricketer who plays for Surrey County Cricket Club. He is a left handed batsman and a leg break bowler.

Career
Gumbs joined the Surrey Academy in 2022. Previously he has been in age group cricket with the county and made his 4-day debut in Second XI cricket in 2021 against Somerset Second XI at Taunton Vale, scoring 86. He has also played for Slough Cricket Club.

He made his List A debut on 14 August, 2022 against Sussex in the Royal London One-Day Cup. Gumbs made his maiden List A half century on 17 August, 2022 for Surrey against Somerset at The Oval.

References

External links

2004 births
Living people
Surrey cricketers
English cricketers
Sportspeople from Slough
People educated at Bradfield College